Norway is scheduled to compete at the 2024 Summer Olympics in Paris from 26 July to 11 August 2024. Norwegian athletes have appeared in every edition of the Summer Olympic Games, except for two occasions: the sparsely attended 1904 Summer Olympics in St. Louis and the 1980 Summer Olympics in Moscow, because of the country's support for the United States-led boycott.

Competitors
The following is the list of number of competitors in the Games.

Athletics

Norwegian track and field athletes achieved the entry standards for Paris 2024, either by passing the direct qualifying mark (or time for track and road races) or by world ranking, in the following events (a maximum of 3 athletes each):

Track and road events

Handball

Summary

Women's tournament

Norway women's national handball team qualified for the Olympics by winning the gold medal and securing an outright berth at the final match of the 2022 European Championships in Ljubljana, Slovenia.

Team roster
 Women's team event – 1 team of 14 players

Shooting

Norwegian shooters achieved quota places for the following events based on their results at the 2022 and 2023 ISSF World Championships, 2022, 2023, and 2024 European Championships, 2023 European Games, and 2024 ISSF World Olympic Qualification Tournament, if they obtained a minimum qualifying score (MQS) from 14 August 2022 to 9 June 2024.

References

Nations at the 2024 Summer Olympics
2024
2024 in Norwegian sport